The Freusburg is a castle high above the Sieg Valley, which also gives its name to a village (Freusburg Siedlung).  It lies between Mudersbach and Kirchen and has belonged since 1969 to the town of Kirchen.  Before that, Freusburg was a self-governing municipality.  In earlier times the location had its own court of justice.

 Freusburg was first mentioned in the year 913, under the name "Fruodeesbraderofanc" (Bifanc of Fruodberg). "Bifanc" signifies a court holding or lord's headquarters.  The first documented citation dates from the year 1048.

The castle itself is believed to have been built around 1100. It was first mentioned by name in connection with the division of an estate in 1247.  About 1580, Count Henry IV renovated the castle.  In 1896, it came into the possession of the Prussian Forstfiskus, and served for years as a forest house.

The castle and grounds have been used since 1928 as a youth hostel. Over time, modifications to keep up with the times became necessary.  On October 23, 1986, after a complete renovation, it was ceremonially reopened by German President Richard von Weizsäcker.  At about 60,000 overnight stays a year, it ranks with the most visited youth hostels in Germany.

Freusburg provides an excellent view of the surrounding woods and of the Sieg Valley and Freusburg Mill.

Castles in Rhineland-Palatinate
Buildings and structures in Altenkirchen (district)